This article show all participating team squads at the 2009 FIVB Women's Volleyball World Grand Prix, played by twelve countries with the final round held in Tokyo, Japan.

The following is the Brazil roster in the 2009 FIVB World Grand Prix.
Head Coach: José Roberto Guimarães

The following is the China roster in the 2009 FIVB World Grand Prix.

The following is the Dominican Republic roster in the 2009 FIVB World Grand Prix.
Head Coach: Marcos Kwiek

The following is the Germany roster in the 2009 FIVB World Grand Prix.

The following is the Japan roster in the 2009 FIVB World Grand Prix.

The following is the South Korea roster in the 2009 FIVB World Grand Prix.

The following is the Netherlands roster in the 2009 FIVB World Grand Prix.

The following is the Poland roster in the 2009 FIVB World Grand Prix.

The following is the Puerto Rico roster in the 2009 FIVB World Grand Prix.

The following is the Russia roster in the 2009 FIVB World Grand Prix.

The following is the Thailand roster in the 2009 FIVB World Grand Prix.
Head Coach: Nataphon Srisamutnak

The following is the United States roster in the 2009 FIVB World Grand Prix.

References

FIVB

2009
2009 in volleyball